Sensenich Propeller, founded in 1932, is an American manufacturer of wood, metal and composite propellers for certified, homebuilt and ultralight aircraft, as well as airboats. The company headquarters is located in Lititz, Pennsylvania.

The company was initially established in 1932 as Sensenich Brothers to make aircraft propellers, but expanded into airboat propellers in 1949, establishing a second factory for that market at Plant City, Florida under the name Sensenich Wood Propeller Company.

See also
List of aircraft propeller manufacturers

References

External links 

Aerospace companies of the United States
Aircraft propeller manufacturers
Manufacturing companies established in 1932